Inula magnifica, the giant fleabane, is a species of flowering plant in the sunflower family Asteraceae, native to the eastern Caucasus. In late summer it bears rich yellow, daisy-like composite flower-heads  in diameter, with narrowly tubular ray florets. It is suitable for planting at the back of a border, or in a wild meadow or prairie-style garden.

The cultivar 'Sonnenstrahl' has gained the Royal Horticultural Society's Award of Garden Merit.

References

magnifica
Flora of the Caucasus
Plants described in 1897